La Casa de la Cultura Ecuatoriana (The House of Ecuadorian Culture) is a cultural organization founded by Benjamín Carrión on August 9, 1944, during the presidency of Dr Jose Maria Velasco Ibarra. It was created to stimulate, to direct and to coordinate the development of an authentic national culture.  Headquartered in Quito, it maintains several museums throughout Ecuador.

External links

Casa de la Cultura Ecuatoriana Benjamín Carrión

Ecuadorian culture
Museums in Ecuador
Museums established in 1944
1944 establishments in South America